The 2012 Emirates Melbourne Cup was the 152nd running of the Melbourne Cup, Australia's most prestigious Thoroughbred horse race. The race, held on Tuesday, 6 November 2012, at Flemington Racecourse (in Melbourne, Victoria), was won by Green Moon, ridden by jockey Brett Prebble, trained by Robert Hickmott, and owned by businessman Lloyd Williams.

The race was attended by the Prince of Wales and his wife the Duchess of Cornwall (Charles and Camilla), with Camilla presenting the cup to the winner of the race.

Prize money
The prize money for the race, held over a distance of 3,200 metres, was A$6.2 million, increased from $6.175 million the previous year. The prize money is split between the first ten runners, with first place taking $3.6 million. The actual cup awarded to the winner of the race (included in the value of the prize money) is valued at $175,000. The race was attended by approximately 106,000 people.

Field

The field for the 2012 Melbourne Cup consisted of 24 horses, with the barrier draw conducted three days prior to the race, on the day of the running of the Victoria Derby. Going into the race, favourites included Americain (winner of the 2010 race), Dunaden (winner of the 2011 race), and Red Cadeaux (second in the 2011 race), with Dunaden having won the 2012 Caulfield Cup, considered an important lead-up race. With Glencadam Gold leading for most of the race, Green Moon pulled clear in the final straight, and eventually won in 3 minutes, 20.45 seconds, with Fiorente a length behind in second place, and Jakkalberry in third. Ethiopia finished last, 63 lengths behind the winner, having injured a tendon during the race. Green Moon's win was the first in the cup for both the horse's jockey, Brett Prebble, and trainer, Robert Hickmott, and the fourth win overall for the owner, Lloyd Williams, who thus became the equal most successful owner in the race's history. The win was later described as "a major upset", with Green Moon having been priced at $22.50 for a win and $7.40 for a place.
Except where otherwise listed, horses are trained in Australia:

See also
 List of Melbourne Cup winners

References

2012
Melbourne Cup
Melbourne Cup
2010s in Melbourne
November 2012 sports events in Australia